Teeswater is a community in the municipality of South Bruce, Bruce County, Ontario, Canada. It is located 12 kilometres west of Mildmay, 16 kilometres north of Wingham on County Road 4, and 25 kilometres southeast of Ripley on Bruce Road 6. The population in 2016 was 995.

History
Teeswater is located on the Teeswater River, a tributary of the Saugeen River.  Surveyors named the river after the River Tees in England and the settlement was named for the river.  The post office dates from 1855.  The first settlers, mainly English and Scottish, arrived in 1856.  Teeswater was incorporated as a village in 1875 and remained a separate municipality until it was amalgamated with Culross Township to form the Township of Teeswater-Culross in 1998.  In 1999, Teeswater-Culross was itself amalgamated with the Township of Mildmay-Carrick to form the new municipality of South Bruce.  Teeswater is the administrative centre of South Bruce and the largest community in the municipality.

A weekly newspaper, The Teeswater News was published from 1871 until 1996. The building where the weekly newspaper was published burned down. Now in its place is The Kinsman Memorial park. The park was finished October 2008.

Teeswater nurtured a musical tradition as it grew, supporting first a string orchestra and a later a flourishing concert band. It is home to the Highlanders Pipes and Drums] (established in 1961), which regularly presents concerts on the lawn beside the Town Hall.

Churches
Knox Presbyterian Church was built in the 1870s, and is now a continuing congregation of the Presbyterian Church in Canada. Another church of the same denomination, Westminster Presbyterian Church, burnt to the ground in the 1970s. Teeswater United Church was built in 1879 as the Wesleyan Methodist Church. It became the Teeswater Methodist Church in 1884, and since 1925 has been affiliated with the United Church of Canada. Sacred Heart Roman Catholic Church was built around the same time as the two Protestant churches, and is located next to the school of the same name. In the past, Teeswater has been home to churches of the Anglican, Baptist, Pentecostal, Free Presbyterian, Episcopal Methodist, and Wesleyan Methodist faiths. Now there are only three churches: the Roman Catholic, United, and Presbyterian.

Demographics 

Economy
Homeowner septic systems were replaced with a community sewer system in Teeswater and Formosa.

The population of Teeswater has remained fairly constant over the past 100 years at approximately 1100.

Grist Mills
Teeswater was a site of 2 commercial grist mills, Littles mill, and the Teeswater & district Co-op grist mill. Littles mill is still standing and is now a house, with the mill pond and river dam still in place. The co-op mill burnt down in 1976, and the dam taken out in about 1991. The pond location and dam bed can still be seen today. For many years before and after the mill burned down, children would go and play ice hockey on the frozen mill pond. The site of the co-op mill building is located near the Teeswater Creamery holding tank for spoiled milk.

Teeswater Creamery
Teeswater Creamery was first established in 1875, and has been a major provider of employment since then.  It was run by Thompson Brothers from 1932 until 1981, when it was sold to Gay Lea.

Education
The village is currently home to two schools, Hillcrest Central Public School (Bluewater District School Board), and Sacred Heart Catholic School (Bruce-Grey Catholic District School Board.

Library
Teeswater has the Bruce County Public Library, Teeswater branch. It is a Carnegie Library.

Infrastructure
The Teeswater-Culross Fire Hall occupies the former British Petroleum Canada (BP) service station.  In 1959, the service station was destroyed by fire.  The lot was purchased and a new garage was erected under the BP banner.  In 1976, the garage was sold to the Teeswater-Culross Fire Department.

Notable people
 Jennie Fletcher - a swimmer who moved to Teeswater after winning gold for Britain in swimming at the 1912 Olympics
 James Gillies - founding Dean of the Schulich School of Business and M.P. during the 30th Canadian Parliament
 Mary Riter Hamilton, painter

See also

 List of unincorporated communities in Ontario

References

Communities in Bruce County
Designated places in Ontario
Former villages in Ontario
Populated places disestablished in 1998